Brian John Caterer (31 January 1943 – 21 January 2010) was an English professional football centre half and manager who made one appearance in the Football League for Brentford. Either side of his spell with Brentford, he had a long career in non-league football. He began his career in management as an assistant at Maidenhead United, before becoming a manager in his own right.

Honours 
Windsor & Eton
 Athenian League (2): 1979–80, 1980–81

Career statistics

References

1943 births
English footballers
English Football League players
Brentford F.C. players
2010 deaths
Footballers from Hayes, Hillingdon
Association football central defenders
Hayes F.C. players
Uxbridge F.C. players
Chesham United F.C. players
Southall F.C. players
Leatherhead F.C. players
Maidenhead United F.C. players
Windsor & Eton F.C. managers
Woking F.C. managers
Maidenhead United F.C. managers
Isthmian League managers
Slough Town F.C. players
Isthmian League players
Leatherhead F.C. managers
English football managers